Les Truands  is a French comedy film starring Eddie Constantine directed by Carlo Rim. For English-speaking audiences it was renamed as Lock Up Your Spoons respectively The Gangsters.

Synopsis 
This is the story of racketeer Amédée who recalls the story of his life when he is already more than 100 years old. He tells his family about his rise and his rivals. This is all to explain why he couldn't help but nick the watch of the mayor, who came to congratulate him.

Cast 
 Eddie Constantine as Jim Esposito, racketeer in Marseille
 Noël-Noël as Cahuzac, racketeer in Bordeaux
 Jean Richard as Alexandre Benoit, Amédée's son
 Yves Robert as Amédée Benoit (and his father)
 Sylvie as Clarisse Benoit
 Lucien Baroux as the priest
 Mireille Granelli as Clarisse at the age of 18 years
 Denise Provence as La Païva
 Line Noro as Chiffon
 Junie Astor as Mlle Puc, the tailoress
 Héléna Manson as Nana
 Robert Dalban as Pépito Benoit
 Gaston Modot as Justin Benoit
 Cora Vaucaire as a singer
 Claude Borelli as a wife of Jim
 Antonin Berval as Benoit's third-born son
 Martine Alexis as a wife of Jim
 Irène Tunc as a wife of Jim
 Ariane Lancell as a saloon girl
 Béatrice Arnac as Mme Léonce
 Guy Tréjean as Bobby, the lover of Cahuzac's daughter
 Albert Rémy as policeman
 Nadine Tallier as a wife of Jim
 Claude Godard as a wife of Jim
 Françoise Delbart as the twin's mother
 André Bervil as Ange
 Daniel Sorano as the barkeeper
 Robert Vattier as the Duke of Morny
 André Dalibert as a police officer
 Michel Nastorg as town mayor
 Léon Larive as photographer
 Pascal Alexandre as Jim as child
 Christian Denhez as Amédée as child
 Jean d'Yd as the grandfather
 Nelly Vignon as Madeleine Cahuzac
 Jacques Mancier as police inspector
 Henri Cogan as a cowboy

References

External links
 
 

1956 films
1956 comedy films
French comedy films
1950s French-language films
French black-and-white films
1950s French films